Hop-tu-Naa is a Celtic festival celebrated in the Isle of Man on 31 October. It is the celebration of the traditional Celtic festival of Samhain, the start of winter. It is thought to be the oldest unbroken tradition in the Isle of Man.

Etymology
The Manx name Oie Houney corresponds to the Irish Oíche Shamhna, which was pronounced the same (though not in revived Manx). The exact status of Oíche Shamhna and its role in the Celtic calendar has been a matter of debate. Oíche Shamhna eventually mutated into Halloween in northern England and in Ireland, it was carried to America by Irish immigrants and developed into the modern Halloween.

The term Hop-tu-naa comes from a Manx Gaelic song traditionally sung during the festival which included the nonsense Hop-tu-naa as a refrain; such nonsense rhymes are common theme in Irish and Scottish Gaelic music.

Traditions
On the Isle of Man today, many groups of people continue the tradition of singing Hop-tu-Naa songs "around the houses" (which traditionally referred to waits going around visiting houses, especially those of the wealthy, and soliciting gifts; beggars going "around the houses" are featured in The Deemster) with turnip lanterns. In addition to this, many public Hop-tu-Naa events take place across the Isle of Man each year, most of which today include competitions for artistically carving turnips and the singing of traditional songs. As well as the many events run within local communities, the National Folk Museum at Cregneash hosts an event to teach the traditional Hop-tu-Naa song and to help people to carve turnips.

Turnip lanterns
At the modern Hop-tu-Naa, children dress up and go from house to house hoping to be given sweets or money, as elsewhere. The children carry carved "turnip" lanterns (which are known as "moots" by the Manx) and sing Hop-tu-Naa songs. There are regional varieties of how turnips should be carved for Hop-tu-Naa, with variations focusing on which way up the turnip is and the nature of the decorations. It is believed that turnip-lanterns do not date earlier than the start of the 19th century, as the vegetable had only been introduced at the end of the previous century. In the past children would bring the stumps of turnips with them and batter the doors of those who refused to give them any money, in an ancient form of trick or treat. This practice appears to have died out.

Dancing
A hop-tu-naa dance was collected by both Mona Douglas and Leighton Stowell. It was believed to have been danced through the streets on Hop-tu-Naa night by couples carrying their turnip-lanterns. It is a simple procession dance for pairs of dancers which involves the Manx reel step and a combination of arches only. This dance is taught in many schools on the Isle of Man during October each year, and it is danced at many of the Hop-tu-Naa events across the island.

Divination
Some of the older customs are similar to those now attached to the January New Year. It was a time for prophesying, weather prediction and fortune-telling. Last thing at night, the ashes of a fire were smoothed out on the hearth to receive the imprint of a foot. If, next morning, the track pointed towards the door, someone in the house would die, but if the footprint pointed inward, it indicated a birth.

A cake was made which was called Soddag Valloo or Dumb Cake, because it was made and eaten in silence. Young women and girls all had a hand in baking it on the red embers of the hearth, first helping to mix the ingredients (flour, eggs, eggshells, soot and salt) and kneading the dough. The cake was divided up and eaten in silence and, still without speaking, all who had eaten it went to bed, walking backwards, expecting and hoping to see their future husband in a dream or vision. The future husband was expected to appear in the dream and offer a drink of water.

Other means of divination was to steal a salt herring from a neighbour, roast it over the fire, eat it in silence and retire to bed; or to hold water in your mouth and a pinch of salt in each hand as you listen to a neighbour's conversation, whereupon the first name mentioned would be that of your future spouse.

Traditional foods
Traditional food for Hop-tu-Naa includes mrastyr: potatoes, parsnips and fish mashed up with butter. Any leftovers from this evening meal would be left out with crocks of fresh water for the fairies. Toffee would also be made, with just sugar and water, as a communal activity on the evening of Hop-tu-Naa.

Songs

The Hop-tu-Naa Song

Modern Hop-tu-Naa songs

Different versions of Hop-tu-naa songs were sung in different areas of the island.

"Jinnie the Witch" is a modern Manx English song, which was sung around the Douglas area.

According to Hampton Creer, Jinny's real name was Joney Lowney. She lived in Braddan and was tried at Bishop's Court for witchcraft in 1715 and 1716. Her greatest "crime" was stopping the Ballaughton Corn Mill. She was sentenced to 14 days' imprisonment, fined £3 and made to stand at the four market crosses dressed in sackcloth.

The modern song goes as follows :

Hop-tu-Naa
My mother's gone away
And she won't be back until the morning

Jinnie the Witch flew over the house
To fetch the stick to lather the mouse

Hop-tu-Naa
My mother's gone away
And she won't be back until the morning

Hop-tu-Naa, Traa-la-laa

In the west of the island a longer version was sung, which is more closely related to the Manx version.

The following version dates from the 1930s – a similar version is recorded in "A Vocabulary of the Anglo-Manx Dialect" by A. W. Moore, Sophia Morrison and Edmund Goodwin (1924):

Hop-tu-naa! put in the pot
Hop-tu-naa! put in the pan
Hop-tu-naa! I burnt me throt (throat)
Hop-tu-naa! guess where I ran?
Hop-tu-naa! I ran to the well
Hop-tu-naa! and drank my fill
Hop-tu-naa! and on the way back
Hop-tu-naa! I met a witch cat
Hop-tu-naa! the cat began to grin
Hop-tu-naa! and I began to run
Hop-tu-naa! I ran to Ronague
Hop-tu-naa! guess what I saw there?
Hop-tu-naa! I saw an old woman
Hop-tu-naa! baking bonnags
Hop-tu-naa! roasting sconnags
Hop-tu-naa! I asked her for a bit
Hop-tu-naa! she gave me a bit
as big as me big toe
Hop-tu-naa! she dipped it in milk
Hop-tu-naa! she wrapped it in silk
Hop-tu-naa! Traa la lay!
If you're going to give us anything, give it to us soon
before we run away with the light of the moon!

The 1970s southern version from Castletown includes the mention of the Witches Mill, the Smelt Monument and the Old House of Keys:

This is auld hollantide night, the moon shines clear and bright
Hop-tu-naa, traa-la-laa
Jinnie the witch jumped over the college to fetch the stick to stir the porridge
Hop-tu-naa, traa-la-laa
Castletown square is mighty bare, there isn't a statue that should have been there
Hop-tu-naa, traa-la-laa
The castle is grey, and Parliament gone, the harbour is quiet no smugglers run
Hop-tu-naa, traa-la-laa

When lights were turned out and no sweets were given, there was a further chorus:

This is old hollantide night, the moon is shining bright
if you're going to bring us money 
You better bring it quick
as we may start to sing again, and your neighbours will think you're thick
Hop-tu-naa, traa-la-laa
Jinnie the witch is over the mill if you don't give us something quick 
she will come and get you.

New songs for Hop-tu-Naa continue to be created, the most notable of which was written by Scaanjoon in 2015, having been commissioned by Culture Vannin. This has been taken up by the Manx traditional music youth group, Bree, as a part of their repertoire.

Images of carved hop-tu-naa turnips

See also
 Allantide
 Calan Gaeaf
 Guising
 Halloween
 Hogmanay
 Samhain

References

External links
 Hoptunaa information and resources from Culture Vannin
 Hop-tu-naa turnip carving, a short video explaining how to carve a traditional Peel turnip
 Recordings of the songs associated with hop-tu-naa
 A performance of the hop-tu-naa dance

Festivals in the Isle of Man
Halloween
October observances
Manx words and phrases
Celtic music festivals
Autumn events in the Isle of Man
Manx culture
Divination